Redding Regional Airport  is 6 miles (10 km) southeast of Redding in Shasta County, California, United States. It is one of two airports in Redding, along with Benton Airpark. In addition to general aviation, the airport has scheduled passenger flights nonstop to and from Burbank (BUR) on Avelo Airlines Boeing 737s, Los Angeles (LAX) and San Francisco (SFO) on United Express Canadair CRJ200 and CRJ700 regional jets, and Alaska Airlines Embraer E175 service to Seattle   (SEA).

History
The city wanted a new airport and put in for a Works Progress Administration project that was called the Stillwater Airfield. Before the airfield was built in 1942, the site was acquired by the United States Army Corps of Engineers for the United States Army Air Forces and built the Redding Army Airfield. Initially, this was a sub-base for Chico AAF and garrisoned by the 433d Army Air Force Base Unit. It was under IV Fighter Command at Hamiltion AAF.

The mission of Redding Army Air Field was advanced flight training of new airmen prior to their deployment overseas into the combat zones of the Pacific, China, Mediterranean or European Theaters. The USAAF 399th Fighter Squadron, 369th Fighter Group operated P-39 Airacobras from the airfield for that mission.

On November 1, 1944, control of Redding AAF was transferred from the Fourth Air Force to the Sacramento Area Command of the Army Air Forces' Air Technical Service Command headquartered at McClellan Field near Sacramento. The host unit was redesignated as the 4191st Army Air Force Base Unit. The mission was changed from training aircrews to being a refueling and maintenance facility for transient aircraft. Redding AAF was sporadically used by the Army Air Forces' Air Transport Command as a refueling and service stop.

On December 19, 1945, the military declared Redding AAF excess, and on November 18, 1946, it was turned over to the city for a civil airfield. The final transfer was in 1949, ending military ownership.

The City of Redding continues to operate the airport and has started a major commercial development.

Southwest Airways was serving the airport during the late 1940s with Douglas DC-3 service with a roundtrip routing of San Francisco - Oakland - Vallejo/Napa - Sacramento - Marysville/Yuba City - Chico - Red Bluff - Redding - Yreka - Medford operated several times a day.  By 1959, Southwest Airways successor Pacific Air Lines had introduced new  Fairchild F-27 turboprop flights operated on a daily roundtrip routing of Redding - Chico - Sacramento - San Francisco - San Jose - Bakersfield - Los Angeles and was also operating nonstop DC-3 service from Eureka/Arcata and Portland, OR.  Pacific Air Lines then merged with Bonanza Air Lines and West Coast Airlines to form Air West which in 1968 was operating all of its flights from the airport with Fairchild F-27 turboprops with direct service to San Francisco, Sacramento, Fresno, Las Vegas, Portland, OR, Eureka/Arcata and Crescent City. Air West was subsequently renamed Hughes Airwest following its acquisition by Howard Hughes and in 1970 was operating all of its flights from Redding with Fairchild F-27 turboprops with nonstop and direct flights to San Francisco, nonstop flights to Chico, Eureka/Arcata and Klamath Falls, and direct flights to Sacramento, Portland, OR, Seattle and Santa Barbara.

Historical jet service included Hughes Airwest (formerly Air West) with Douglas DC-9-10s and McDonnell Douglas DC-9-30s to San Francisco (SFO), Los Angeles (LAX), Portland, OR (PDX) and Seattle (SEA). Frontier Boeing 737-200s flew to Denver (DEN) via Sacramento (SMF). United Airlines flew 737s nonstop and direct to San Francisco (SFO) for several years starting in 1983. Pacific Express BAC One-Elevens flew nonstop to San Francisco (SFO) and on to Los Angeles (LAX) and also to Portland (PDX). In addition, American Eagle service operated by Wings West on behalf of American Airlines, using Fairchild Swearingen Metroliner (Metro III) commuter turboprops, flew nonstop to San Jose (SJC), San Francisco (SFO), Eureka/Arcata (ACV), and Klamath Falls (LMT) at various points until late 1993.

According to the Official Airline Guide (OAG), three airlines were serving the airport in 1995 including Alaska Airlines wholly-owned subsidiary Horizon Air with de Havilland Canada DHC-8 Dash 8 and Dornier 328 turboprop service nonstop from Eureka/Arcata (ACV) and Portland (PDX) as well as direct from Seattle (SEA), Reno Air Express operated by Mid Pacific Air on behalf of Reno Air with British Aerospace BAe Jetstream 31 turboprop service nonstop from Chico (CIC), Medford (MFR), Reno (RNO), Sacramento (SMF) and San Jose (SJC), and United Express operated by WestAir Airlines on behalf of United Airlines with Embraer EMB-120 Brasilia turboprop service nonstop from San Francisco (SFO). By 1996, Sierra Expressway was operating nonstop BAe Jetstream 31 turboprop service to Oakland (OAK).

On July 17, 2008, President George W. Bush and staff landed at Redding in Air Force One to allow the president to see the damage done by wildfires.

Facilities

In 12 months through April 2012 the airport had 104,674 aircraft operations, average 287 per day: 46% local general aviation, 17% transient general aviation, 36% air taxi, <1% scheduled commercial and <1% military. 222 aircraft are based at this airport: 175 single-engine, 27 multi-engine, 15 helicopter and 5 jet.

Ground transportation
The airport is southeast of Redding along Airport Road at Knighton Road. Interstate 5 can be reached to the west via Knighton Road, and California State Route 44 can be reached to the north via Airport Road. Both long-term and short-term parking are available, as well as car rental and taxi services.

Expansion plans
The City of Redding's remodel and expansion of the terminal building was complete as of November 11, 2014, when the grand opening took place. The project cost approximately $9.8 million, with the majority of funds coming from the FAA Airport Improvement Program. The terminal building was expanded from 20,000 sq. ft. to approximately 30,000 sq. ft. The secure passenger holding area increased its holding capacity from 70 passengers to over 200. The holding area now has restrooms, convenience for passengers who previously had to leave the sterile area if they wished to visit the restroom. This project was constructed by the general contractor Danco Builders Northwest, out of Arcata.

Airlines and destinations

Gallery

See also

 California World War II Army Airfields
Benton Field
California during World War II
 California World War II Army Airfields
 Air Transport Command (World War II)
Chico Army Airfield auxiliary fields

External links

Redding Regional Airport at City of Redding web site

References

 
 

1944 establishments in California
Airports in Shasta County, California
Airfields of the United States Army Air Forces in California
Redding, California
Buildings and structures in Redding, California